Anish Bhanwala is an Indian pistol shooter. He is from Karnal Haryana and competes in the 25 meter rapid fire pistol, 25 meter pistol, and 25 meter standard pistol events. Anish joined the Indian Shooting Team in 2017. He represented India at the 2018 Commonwealth Games, 2018 Asian Games, ISSF Junior World Championship 2017 (Suhl), Commonwealth Shooting Championships 2017 (Brisbane), World Shooting Championships 2018 and numerous ISSF Senior and Junior World Cups and South Asian Games, Kathmandu.

Early life 
Bhanwala was born in village Kashandi, Sonipat and brought up in Karnal, Haryana. He attended high school at St. Theresa's Convent Sr. Sec. School. His passion for shooting came while participating in modern pentathlon events.
He participated in Modern Pentathlon World championship in Cyprus when he was just 11 years old. His next Modern Pentathlon competition was UIPM Asian Oceanic (Olympic Qualification Competition) Championship in Beijing, China.

He had the full support of his parents from the just beginning of his sports life. His father borrowed a pistol for him to shoot at a range.
Anish's elder sister Muskan Bhanwala is also an International Medalist. She won an individual Gold and a team Gold medal in ISSF Junior World Cup, Sydney, 2018. She has represented India at various Senior World Cups, Junior World Cups and Junior World Championships winning Bronze in ISSF JR World Championship, Suhl, Germany.
She has won numerous medals in National Shooting Championships.

Career 
He represented the country at U-12 modern pentathlon World Championships in 2013 and Asian Modern Pentathlon Championships in 2015. Shooting was his favourite among the pentathlon's five sports.

He moved to Delhi in 2017 to have the best practice facilities.

In ISSF Junior World Championship 2017, Suhl, Anish won two gold, two silver, and one bronze. In 25m Standard Pistol event Anish created a New World Record by shooting 579/600 score.

In 2017 Commonwealth Shooting Championships, Brisbane, Australia, he won silver in 25m Rapid Fire Men. This was Anish's first senior international competition as a member of Indian squad.

In the Commonwealth Games 2018 at age 15 Anish won a gold medal for India and became the youngest Indian to win a gold medal in Commonwealth Games. He set a new Commonwealth Games final record of 30 hits in the finals.

In ISSF Junior World Cup 2018, Sydney he won one individual gold and one team silver in 25m Rapid Fire Junior Men. 
This was the first time in history that two siblings won individual Gold in any ISSF series. This was the competition where Anish's sister Muskan too won Gold medals.

In ISSF Junior World Cup 2019, Germany, he again won gold in the men's 25m Rapid Fire Pistol.

Anish made his First ISSF Senior's achievement in 2019 in ISSF World Cup, New Delhi when he shot India's New National Record score of 588/600 in the qualification round and secured the 5th rank in the Finals.

Coach 

Anish Bhanwala's personal Coach is DSP Harpreet Singh, 2010 Commonwealth Games Individual and Team Gold Medalist.
Anish was inspired by DSP Harpreet Singh when the police officer won 02 gold medals and a silver Medal in 2010 Commonwealth games and 2014 Commonwealth Games, Glasgow respectively.↵Harpreet has been Anish's mentor since 2015 when they first met in a National Championship and since then he has been the force behind his performance.↵Further when Anish entered into the Indian National Team in 2017, since then he is also guided and trained by the Indian Team foreign coach Mr. Pavel Smirnov.

Recognition 

National Child Award in Sports category.

Mahindra Scorpio TOISA 2018 award for Emerging Player of The Year.

Yono SBI 20 Under 20 Sports Achiever award.

TOISA 2020 award for Emerging Player of The Year.

References

External links
 
 

2002 births
Living people
Indian male sport shooters
ISSF pistol shooters
Sport shooters from Haryana
People from Karnal
Commonwealth Games medallists in shooting
Commonwealth Games gold medallists for India
Shooters at the 2018 Asian Games
Shooters at the 2018 Commonwealth Games
Asian Games competitors for India
Medallists at the 2018 Commonwealth Games